The 2013 All-SEC football team consists of American football players selected to the All-Southeastern Conference (SEC) chosen by the Associated Press (AP) and the conference coaches for the 2013 Southeastern Conference football season.

The Auburn Tigers won the conference, beating the Missouri Tigers 59 to 42 in the SEC Championship. Auburn then lost the national championship to the ACC champion FSU Seminoles 34 to 31.

Auburn running back Tre Mason, a unanimous AP selection, was voted the SEC Offensive Player of the Year. Missouri defensive end Michael Sam, also a unanimous AP selection, was voted the AP SEC Defensive Player of the Year.

Offensive selections

Quarterbacks
 Johnny Manziel, Texas A&M (AP-1, Coaches-1)
 Aaron Murray, Georgia (AP-2)
 A. J. McCarron, Alabama (Coaches-2)

Running backs
 Tre Mason*, Auburn (AP-1, Coaches-1)
 Jeremy Hill, LSU (AP-1, Coaches-2)
 T. J. Yeldon, Alabama (AP-2, Coaches-2)
 Mike Davis, South Carolina (AP-2, Coaches-2)
 Todd Gurley, Georgia (AP-2)

Wide receivers
 Jordan Matthews, Vanderbilt (AP-1, Coaches-1)
 Mike Evans, Texas A&M (AP-1, Coaches-1)
 Jarvis Landry, LSU (AP-2, Coaches-2)
 Dorial Green-Beckham, Missouri (AP-2)
 Odell Beckham Jr., LSU (Coaches-2)

Centers
 Travis Swanson, Arkansas (AP-1, Coaches-2)
 Reese Dismukes, Auburn (AP-2, Coaches-1)

Guards
 Cyrus Kouandjio, Alabama (AP-1, Coaches-1)
 Gabe Jackson, Miss. St. (AP-1, Coaches-1)
 Anthony Steen, Alabama (AP-1, Coaches-2)
 Trai Turner, LSU (AP-2)

Tackles
 Jake Matthews, Texas A&M (AP-1, Coaches-1)
 Wesley Johnson, Vanderbilt (AP-1, Coaches-2)
 Justin Britt, Missouri (AP-1, Coaches-2)
 Greg Robinson, Auburn (AP-1)
 Antonio Richardson, Tennessee (AP-2, Coaches-2)
 Ja'Wuan James, Tennessee (AP-2)
 Laremy Tunsil, Ole Miss (AP-2)

Tight ends
 Arthur Lynch, Georgia (AP-1, Coaches-1)
 Evan Engram, Ole Miss (AP-2)
Hunter Henry, Arkansas (AP-2)
C. J. Uzomah, Auburn (AP-2)
Malcolm Johnson, Miss. St. (Coaches-2)

Defensive selections

Defensive ends
 Michael Sam*, Missouri (AP-1, Coaches-1) 
 Dee Ford, Auburn (AP-1, Coaches-1) 
 Jadeveon Clowney, South Carolina (AP-1, Coaches-1) 
 Kony Ealy, Missouri (AP-1) 
 Bud Dupree, Kentucky (AP-2) 
 Dante Fowler, Florida (AP-2) 
 Trey Flowers, Arkansas (Coaches-2) 
Chris Smith, Arkansas (Coaches-2)

Defensive tackles 
 Kelcy Quarles, South Carolina (AP-1, Coaches-1)
Anthony Johnson, LSU (AP-2, Coaches-2)
 Ed Stinson, Alabama (Coaches-2)

Linebackers
 C. J. Mosley*, Alabama (AP-1, Coaches-1)
 A. J. Johnson, Tennessee (AP-1, Coaches-1)
 Ramik Wilson, Georgia (AP-1, Coaches-1)
 Avery Williamson, Kentucky (AP-2, Coaches-2)
 Lamin Barrow, LSU (AP-2, Coaches-2)
Trey DePriest, Alabama (AP-2)
 Serderius Bryant, Ole Miss (AP-2)
 Sharrod Golightly, South Carolina (AP-2)
 Denzel Nkemdiche, Ole Miss (AP-2)
 Andrew Wilson, Missouri (AP-2)
 Jordan Jenkins, Georgia (Coaches-2)

Cornerbacks
 E. J. Gaines, Missouri (AP-1, Coaches-1) 
 Vernon Hargreaves III, Florida (AP-1, Coaches-1)
 Andre Hal, Vanderbilt (AP-2, Coaches-2)
Chris Davis, Auburn (AP-2, Coaches-2)
Victor Hampton, South Carolina (AP-2)
Loucheiz Purifoy, Florida (AP-2)

Safeties 
 Cody Prewitt, Ole Miss  (AP-1, Coaches-1)
 Kenny Ladler, Vanderbilt (AP-1, Coaches-2)
 Ha Ha Clinton-Dix, Alabama (AP-2, Coaches-1)
Landon Collins, Alabama (AP-2)
Nickoe Whitley, Miss. St. (Coaches-2)

Special teams

Kickers
 Marshall Morgan, Georgia (AP-1, Coaches-1)
 Zach Hocker, Arkansas (AP-2)
Michael Palardy, Tennessee (Coaches-2)

Punters
 Cody Mandell, Alabama (AP-1, Coaches-2)
Drew Kaser, Texas A&M (AP-2, Coaches-1)

All purpose/return specialist
Odell Beckham Jr., LSU (AP-1, Coaches-1)
Christion Jones, Alabama (AP-2, Coaches-1)
Marcus Murphy, Missouri (Coaches-2)
Solomon Patton, Florida (Coaches-2)

Key
Bold = Consensus first-team selection by both the coaches and AP

AP = Associated Press

Coaches = Selected by the SEC coaches

* = Unanimous selection of AP

See also
2013 Southeastern Conference football season
2013 College Football All-America Team

References

All-Southeastern Conference
All-SEC football teams